Geevarghese Mar Barnabas is a Metropolitan of Malankara Orthodox Syrian Church

Early life
H. G. Geevarghese Mar Barnabas was born on 10 April 1973.

Metropolitan
He is elected as the  Metropolitan candidate on   25th February 2022 at the Malankara Association held at Kolenchery. He is consecrated as Metropolitan on  28th July 2022 at St. Mary's Orthodox Cathedral, Pazhanji.

References

1973 births
Living people
Malankara Orthodox Syrian Church bishops